Tom Allen (born 1964) is a Canadian public radio broadcaster, concert host, trombonist and author.

Allen was born in Montreal, Quebec, and studied music at McGill University, Boston University and Yale University. He lives in Toronto, Ontario, with his wife, the harpist Lori Gemmell, and has hosted classical and popular music programming on CBC Music since the 1990s, including Fresh Air, Weekender, Music and Company, Radio 2 Morning, Shift and About Time.

Allen works also as a concert host and a creative consultant for symphony orchestras.  He hosts the Toronto Symphony Orchestra's Afterworks series and has hosted concerts for the Hamilton Philharmonic, the Kitchener-Waterloo Symphony and Symphony Nova Scotia. From 2006 to 2009, he hosted the Detroit Symphony Orchestra's Unmasked series of concerts, working with conductors such as Vladimir Ashkenazy, Hans Graf and Peter Oundjian. With Oundjian he co-created Eight Days in June, a "festival of music and thought" that was described by the Detroit Free Press as a "chaotic success".

Allen has published three books of autobiographical non-fiction: Toe Rubber Blues (1999), Rolling Home (2001) and The Gift of the Game (2005). He received the 2002 Edna Staebler Award for Creative Non-Fiction for Rolling Home, his memoir of a cross-Canada rail journey.

Two of Allen's musical works premiered in 2013: Bohemians in Brooklyn, a cabaret-style revue based upon the lives of the musicians and writers living in Brooklyn, New York, in the 1940s, and The Judgment of Paris, a "chamber musical" about the composers Claude Debussy and Maurice Ravel. Both featured the Canadian soprano Patricia O'Callaghan, the pianist-singer Bryce Kulak, the harpist Lori Gemmell and Allen himself as trombonist and narrator.

References

External links

Tom Allen official CBC webpage

1964 births
Living people
Anglophone Quebec people
Boston University College of Fine Arts alumni
Canadian trombonists
CBC Radio hosts
Classical music radio presenters
McGill University School of Music alumni
Musicians from Montreal
Yale School of Music alumni
Writers from Montreal
20th-century Canadian non-fiction writers
20th-century Canadian male writers
21st-century Canadian non-fiction writers
21st-century Canadian male writers
Canadian male non-fiction writers
Canadian memoirists